A superfamily of brachiopods containing:
 Family Plectorthidae
 Family Cremnorthidae
 Family Cyclocoeliidae
 Family Eoorthidae
 Family Euorthisinidae
 Family Finkelnburgiidae
 Family Giraldiellidae
 Family Phragmorthidae
 Family Platystrophiidae
 Family Ranorthidae
 Family Rhactorthidae
 Family Tasmanorthidae
 Family Wangyuiidae

References

Rhynchonellata